Thomas Richards (5 July 1855 – 14 December 1923) was an Australian cricketer. He played in four first-class matches for South Australia between 1880 and 1884.

See also
 List of South Australian representative cricketers

References

External links
 

1855 births
1923 deaths
Australian cricketers
South Australia cricketers
Cricketers from Adelaide